In mathematics a group is a set together with a binary operation on the set called multiplication that obeys the group axioms. The axiom of choice is an axiom of ZFC set theory which in one form states that every set can be wellordered.

In ZF set theory, i.e. ZFC without the axiom of choice, the following statements are equivalent:

 For every nonempty set  there exists a binary operation  such that  is a group.
 The axiom of choice is true.

A group structure implies the axiom of choice 

In this section it is assumed that every set  can be endowed with a group structure .

Let  be a set. This is the least cardinal number such that there is no injection from  into . It exists without the assumption of the axiom of choice. Assume here for technical simplicity of proof that  has no ordinal. Let  denote multiplication in the group .

For any  there is an  such that . Suppose not. Then there is an  such that  for all . Thus such a  gives an injection from  into . This is impossible since  is a cardinal such that no injection into  exists.

Now define a map  of  into  endowed with the lexicographical wellordering by sending  to the least  such that . By the above reasoning the map  exists and is unique since least elements of subsets of wellordered sets are unique. It is, by elementary group theory, injective.

It follows that every set  can be wellordered and thus that the axiom of choice is true.

The axiom of choice implies a group structure 

Any nonempty finite set has a group structure as a cyclic group generated by any element. Under the assumption of the axiom of choice, every infinite set  is equipotent with a unique cardinal number  which equals an aleph. Using the axiom of choice, one can show that for any family  of sets  (A). Moreover, by Tarski's theorem on choice, another equivalent of the axiom of choice,  for all finite  (B).

For , let , where  denotes the symmetric difference. This turns  into a group with the empty set, being the identity and every element being its own inverse; . The associative property, i.e.  is verified using basic properties of union and set difference. Thus  is a group with multiplication .

Any set that can be put into bijection with a group becomes a group via the bijection. For , let  be the subset of  consisting of all subsets of cardinality exactly . So  for all  (C) by (B).

Putting these results together it is seen that  by (A) and (C). Also, since  contains all singletons. Finally, for  define . This turns  into a group. Hence every set admits a group structure.

A ZF set with no group structure 

There are models of ZF in which the axiom of choice fails. In such a model, there are sets that cannot be well-ordered (call these "non-wellorderable" sets). Let  be any such set. Now consider the set . If  were to have a group structure, then, by the construction in first section,  can be well-ordered. This contradiction shows that there is no group structure on the set .

If a set is such that it cannot be endowed with a group structure, then it is necessarily non-wellorderable. Otherwise the construction in the second section does yield a group structure. However these properties are not equivalent. Namely, it is possible for sets which cannot be well-ordered to have a group structure.

For example, if  is any set, then  has a group structure, with symmetric difference as the group operation. Of course, if  cannot be well-ordered, then neither can . One interesting example of sets which cannot carry a group structure is from sets  with the following two properties:
  is an infinite Dedekind-finite set. In other words,  has no countably infinite subset.
 If  is partitioned into finite sets, then all but finitely many of them are singletons.
To see that the combination of these two cannot admit a group structure, note that given any permutation of such set must have only finite orbits, and almost all of them are necessarily singletons which implies that most elements are not moved by the permutation. Multiplying by  gives that  is in fact the identity element which is a contradiction.

The existence of such a set  is consistent, for example given in Cohen's first model. Surprisingly, however, being an infinite Dedekind-finite set is not enough to rule out a group structure, as it is consistent that there are infinite Dedekind-finite sets with Dedekind-finite power sets.

Notes

References 
 
 
 
 
 

Axiom of choice
Group theory